Adrianus Mooy (born 10 April 1936) is an Indonesian economist. He was previously Governor of Bank of Indonesia, serving the role from 1988 to 1993 during Soeharto's reign. He served as Executive Secretary of the United Nations Economic and Social Commission for Asia and the Pacific (ESCAP) in 1995—2000. He studied at Gadjah Mada University and University of Wisconsin. Since 2010, he is Rector of Pelita Harapan University Surabaya. 

On 13 May 2014, he was awarded an honorary doctorate from Corban University in Oregon in the United States.

References

1936 births
Living people
Indonesian economists
People from East Nusa Tenggara
Gadjah Mada University alumni
University of Wisconsin–Madison alumni
Governors of Bank Indonesia